Yubileyny is a rural locality (a settlement) in Ustyuzhenskoye Rural Settlement, Ustyuzhensky District, Vologda Oblast, Russia. The population was 412 as of 2002. There are 19 streets.

Geography 
Ustyuzhna is the nearest rural locality.

References 

Rural localities in Ustyuzhensky District